Michael P. Schaefer (April 30, 1946 – January 21, 2013) was a member of the Pennsylvania State Senate, serving from 1977 to 1980. He died January 21, 2013.

References

Democratic Party Pennsylvania state senators
1938 births
2013 deaths
University of Notre Dame alumni
Georgetown University Law Center alumni